ISP often refers to Internet service provider. ISP may also refer to:

Places
 Islip railway station (Network Rail station code ISP), England
 Long Island MacArthur Airport (IATA Airport code ISP), New York, US

Education
 Information Society Project, at Yale Law School
 Institute of Southern Punjab, a university in Pakistan
 Instituto Superior Politécnico, a university in São Tomé and Príncipe
 Institut supérieur de philosophie, the Higher Institute of Philosophy in Louvain-la-Neuve, Belgium
 Integrated science program, an honors program at Northwestern University
 International School of Panama
 International School of Paris, France
 International School of Prague, Czech Republic
 Petnica Science Center (Istraživačka Stanica Petnica)

Law enforcement
 Idaho State Police
 Illinois State Police
 Indiana State Police
 Iowa State Patrol
 Iowa State Penitentiary, Fort Madison, Iowa, US

Organizations
 Independent Socialist Party (disambiguation), in several countries
 Institute of Sales Promotion, UK
 Integrated Service Provider, a type of logistics services firm
 Intesa Sanpaolo, Italian bank
 ISP Sports, US marketing and broadcast company
 Independence for Scotland Party

Science and technology

Computing
 Image signal processor
 In-system programming, of programmable logic devices in-circuit
 Information Systems Professional, an information technology title and post-nominal
 Interface segregation principle, a principle of object-oriented design
 Internet service provider, an organization that provides services for accessing, using, or participating in the Internet
 ISP Formal Verification Tool, a verification tool for MPI (Message Passing Interface) programs

Other uses in science and technology
 Imperial smelting process, in zinc smelting
 Polarization in astronomy, interstellar polarization
 Specific impulse (Isp), a measure of rocket and jet efficiency